The Consultative Assembly of Luxembourg was established in 1945 towards the end of World War II, when it became clear that the Chamber of Deputies could not fulfill its constitutional role. The point of the Consultative Assembly was to exercise those rights accorded to the Chamber by the constitution and laws, with the exception of legislative powers.

After World War II ended in Luxembourg on 10 September 1944, a session of the Chamber was called for 6 December 1944. Out of the 55 Deputies of the pre-war Chamber, only 25 were present. 9 Deputies had died, 10 were still in German prisons or concentration camps, and 9 were under suspicion of collaboration with the German occupation. As fewer than half the Deputies were there, there was no quorum, as demanded by the constitution. Therefore, the Chamber was not capable of functioning and taking decisions.

At the urging of the Unio'n, the umbrella organisation of the Resistance, a Consultative Assembly was established by Grand-Ducal decree on 22 February 1945, in order for the Liberation Government to be advised in its duties. The members of the Assembly were appointed by another decree on 12 March 1945. It started its activities just days after the last Luxembourgish villages, near Echternach, had been liberated.

From 20 March 1945 to 16 August 1945, 18 sessions of the Assembly took place.

Members

 Joseph Artois
 Jean-Pierre Assa
 Jean-Pierre Bauer
 Nicolas Biever
 René Blum
 Paul Bohr
 Marcel Cahen
 Hubert Clement
 Emile Colling
 Othon Decker
 Gaston Diderich
 Aloyse Duhr
 Léon Flammang
 Nelly Flick
 Pierre Gansen
 Henri Gengler
 Pierre Godart
 Emile Hamilius
 Venant Hildgen
 Nicolas Jacoby
 Jean Kill
 Léon Kinsch
 Adolphe Klein
 Nicolas Kremer
 Ferdinand Kuhn
 Jean-Pierre Lenertz
 Jean Leischen
 Jean Lutgen
 Jean Maroldt
 Nicolas Mathieu
 Albert Meyers
 Denis Netgen
 François Neu
 Alphonse Osch
 Victor Prost
 Edouard Reiland
 Emile Reuter
 Alphonse Rodesch
 Emile Schaus
 Jean-Pierre Schloesser
 Tony Schmit
 Pierre Schockmel
 Joseph Schroeder
 Gustave Schuman
 Joseph Simon
 Michel Speltz
 Dominique Steichen
 Robert Stumper
 Jean-Jacques Theisen
 Dominique Urbany
 Arthur Useldinger
 Etienne Weber
 Camille Welter
 Louis Welter
 Nicolas Welter
 Victor Wilhelm
 Nicolas Wirtgen

See also 
 Council of State of Luxembourg

References 

Political history of Luxembourg
Historical legislatures
History of Luxembourg (1945–present)